Stealing Heaven is a 1988 film directed by Clive Donner and starring Derek de Lint, Kim Thomson and Denholm Elliott. It is a costume drama based on the French 12th-century medieval romance (a true story) of Peter Abelard and Héloïse and on a historical novel by Marion Meade. This was Donner's final theatrical film, before his death in 2010.

Plot
Peter Abelard is a famous teacher of philosophy at the cathedral school of Notre Dame, and a champion of reason. At a time when academics are required to observe chastity, he falls in love with one of his students, Héloïse d'Argenteuil, a sixteen-year-old gentlewoman raised in a convent, who has both intellectual curiosity and a rebellious view of the low status of women in 12th-century Europe.

When the relationship is suspected, Heloise's uncle Fulbert, who had other plans for her marriage, works with the bishop of Paris to put a stop to it. Nevertheless, Abelard and Heloise pursue their relationship; they make love in her bed and also within a barn (they are overheard by a peasant girl when they come) and eventually have a child and later are secretly married. Abelard struggles with himself for acting against the will of God by loving Heloise. Her uncle takes a terrible revenge on Abelard for ruining Heloise's chances of an advantageous match.

Cast 

 Derek de Lint as Peter Abelard
 Kim Thomson as Heloise d'Argenteuil
 Denholm Elliott as Fulbert
 Bernard Hepton as Bishop
 Kenneth Cranham as Suger
 Rachel Kempson as Prioress
 Mark Jax as Jourdain
 Angela Pleasence as Sister Cecilia
 Timothy Watson as François
 Patsy Byrne as Agnes
 Victoria Burgoyne as Prostitute
 Philip Locke as Poussin
 Cassie Stuart as Petronilla
 Andrew McLean as Gerard
 Thomas Lockyer (actor) as Thomas
 Mark Audley as Luke
 Kai Dominic as Paul
 Miki Hewitt as Sister Claire
 Yvonne Bryceland as Baroness Lamarck
 Vjenceslav Kapural as Baron Lamarck
 Ivo Husnjak as Gaston Lamarck
 Jeremy Hawk as Ancient Priest
 Moniek Kramer as Jeanne
 Drago Mitrovic as Priest
 Zvonimir Ferencic as Bishop
 Eugen Marcelic as Astrolabe
 Lela Simecki as Sister Therese

Production
The picture was filmed on location in Yugoslavia. Denholm Elliott had worked with Donner before, having starred in Nothing But the Best (1964).

Reception
Michael Wilmington of the Los Angeles Times called the movie "fascinatingly retrograde", as it "suggests the ‘60s: decade of turbulence, idealism, sex and riot." He notes that the director, Clive Donner, had made his best known films in that decade, such as The Caretaker (1963) and What’s New, Pussycat? (1965). Wilmington is critical of the production and the characterizations and he objects to the omission of the couple’s important surviving love-letters, but he finds the actors easy to watch. "De Lint glows with dedication, Thompson tosses her great Cosmo cover-girl mane ravishingly. Elliott is a fine, squirrelly, sweating villain."

Caryn James reviewed the picture in The New York Times:

See also
 List of historical drama films

References

External links
 

1980s biographical drama films
1980s British films
1988 independent films
1988 romantic drama films
1980s historical drama films
British historical drama films
British biographical drama films
British independent films
British romantic drama films
1980s English-language films
Films directed by Clive Donner
Films set in Paris
Films set in the 12th century
Films about educators
Films based on American novels
Drama films based on actual events
Romance films based on actual events